Damien Mama (born June 27, 1995) is an American football guard. He played college football at USC.

Early years
Mama attended St. John Bosco High School, where he was a two-way player at offensive tackle and defensive tackle. 

As a senior, he contributed to the team winning the CIF Pac-5 Division championship and the CIF state championship Open Division bowl game. He also received All-East Region, All-CIF Pac-5 Division, Max Preps All-State Division I first team, Los Angeles Times All-Area Lineman of the Year, USA Today All-USA first team, Parade All-American first team, Prep Star All-American Dream Team and Max Preps All-American honors.

College career
Mama accepted a football scholarship from USC. As a true freshman, he appeared in 12 games (all but Washington State), starting the first two contests at right guard and two additional games at left guard.

As a sophomore, he started 13 out of 14 games (all but UCLA) at left offensive guard. 

As a junior, he started all games at left offensive guard. He declared for the NFL Draft before the start of his senior season.

Professional career

Kansas City Chiefs
Mama was signed as an undrafted free agent by the Kansas City Chiefs after the 2017 NFL Draft on May 6. He was waived on September 2, 2017 and was signed to the Chiefs' practice squad the next day.

New York Giants
On December 12, 2017, Mama was signed by the New York Giants off the Chiefs' practice squad. He was waived by the Giants on May 7, 2018.

Dallas Cowboys
On May 21, 2018, Mama signed with the Dallas Cowboys. He was waived on September 1.

San Diego Fleet
On October 14, 2018, Mama signed with the San Diego Fleet of the Alliance of American Football (AAF) . He was a starter until the league folded in April 2019.

Los Angeles Wildcats
Mama was drafted in the 5th round in phase two in the 2020 XFL Draft by the Los Angeles Wildcats.

New York Guardians
On January 21, 2020, Mama was sent to the New York Guardians in a three-team trade. In March, amid the COVID-19 pandemic, the league announced that it would be cancelling the rest of the season. He played in all 5 games at offensive guard. He had his contract terminated when the league suspended operations on April 10, 2020.

Tampa Bay Bandits
Mama was selected in the 23rd round of the 2022 USFL Draft by the Tampa Bay Bandits.

Mama and all other Tampa Bay Bandits players were all transferred to the Memphis Showboats after it was announced that the Bandits were taking a hiatus and that the Showboats were joining the league.

San Antonio Brahmas
On February 15, 2023, Mama signed with the San Antonio Brahmas of the XFL. He was released on March 8.

References

External links
USC Trojans bio

1995 births
Living people
American football offensive guards
American sportspeople of Samoan descent
Dallas Cowboys players
Kansas City Chiefs players
Los Angeles Wildcats (XFL) players
New York Giants players
New York Guardians players
People from Moreno Valley, California
San Antonio Brahmas players
San Diego Fleet players
Sportspeople from Riverside County, California
Players of American football from California
The Spring League players
USC Trojans football players
Tampa Bay Bandits (2022) players